New Adventures of Batman and Robin, the Boy Wonder, also known as simply Batman and Robin, is a 15-chapter serial released in 1949 by Columbia Pictures. It is a sequel to the 1943 serial Batman, although with different actors. Robert Lowery played Batman, while Johnny Duncan played Robin. Supporting players included Jane Adams as Vicki Vale and veteran character actor Lyle Talbot as Commissioner Gordon.

The serials were re-released as Video On Demand titles by Rifftrax, the alumni project of former Mystery Science Theater 3000  members Michael J. Nelson, Kevin Murphy and Bill Corbett. As of September 2014, they have released the entire serial. Turner Classic Movies has broadcast the film serial from June to November 2015 and from October 2021 to January 2022 in a weekly half-hour slot on Saturday mornings.

Plot
The dynamic duo face off against the Wizard, a hooded villain with an electrical device which controls cars to augment his compulsion to set challenges for Batman and Robin. The Wizard's identity remains a mystery to the caped crusaders throughout until the end.

Cast
 Robert Lowery as Bruce Wayne / Batman
 Johnny Duncan as Dick Grayson / Robin
 Jane Adams as Vicki Vale
 Lyle Talbot as Commissioner Jim Gordon
 Ralph Graves as Winslow Harrison
 Don C. Harvey as Nolan, a henchman
 William Fawcett as Professor Hammil
 Leonard Penn as Carter, Hammil's valet, and The Wizard, Carter's evil twin
 Rick Vallin as Barry Brown, a tabloid radio gossip
 Michael Whalen as Dunne, a private investigator
 Lee Roberts as Neal, a henchman 
 Greg McClure as Evans, a henchman
 House Peters, Jr. as Earl, a henchman
 Jim Diehl as Jason, a henchman
 Rusty Wescoatt as Ives, a henchman
 Eric Wilton as Alfred Pennyworth 
 George Offerman Jr. as Jimmie Vale, Vicki's brother and henchman

Production

"As usual on a Katzman production," note Harmon and Glut, "the low budget showed everywhere in money-saving shortcuts, and inadequacies." The Batman costume had a poorly fitting cowl and the Robin costume added pink tights to cover the "hairy legs" of both the actor and the stuntman. The Batmobile is again excluded, but instead of a limousine as in the first serial, the duo drive around in a 1949 Mercury.

Several mistakes and failures of logic occur in the serial. One example is that the film shows the Bat-Signal working in broad daylight. Another occurs when, despite the fact that the heroes' utility belts had been replaced by normal belts with no pockets or pouches for this serial, in order to escape from a vault, Batman pulls the nozzle and hose of an oxy-acetylene torch from his belt to cut through a steel door (the tanks for the torch are not shown); to compound this mistake, it is a full-sized oxy-acetylene torch that would have been impossible to carry unseen on his person. Harmon and Glut suggest that this was probably scripted to be a miniaturised 3-inch torch, as used in the comics, but the filmmakers improvised in following the directions for a "blowtorch."

Release

In 1989, GoodTimes Entertainment released the serial on VHS, splitting the entire serial into two separate, budget-priced tapes recorded in LP mode. The GoodTimes edition was slightly edited, as well, with several minutes of the opening chapter mysteriously cut. In 1997, Columbia TriStar Home Video re-released the uncut serial (in SP mode) as a complete 2-tape VHS set. Sony Pictures Home Entertainment released the serial on DVD in 2005, timed to coincide with the theatrical release of Batman Begins. Unlike its predecessor, Batman and Robin: The Complete 1949 Movie Serial Collection has been given a restoration. On February 4, 2014, Mill Creek Entertainment released Gotham City Serials, a two-disc DVD set that includes both the 1943 Batman serial and the 1949 Batman and Robin serial. Rifftrax released a Video On Demand of the first installment of the short on July 16, 2013, featuring a running mocking commentary from Michael J. Nelson, Kevin Murphy and Bill Corbett of Mystery Science Theater 3000 fame. The final episode, "Batman Victorious," was released with commentary on September 19, 2014.

Chapter titles
Turner Classic Movies began airing episodes of Batman and Robin in June 2015, following one week after the conclusion of airing the previous 1943 serial. Broadcast paused in August in favor of alternate programming, but resumed in September.

 Batman Takes Over (broadcast June 27, 2015 on TCM)
 Tunnel of Terror (broadcast July 11, 2015 on TCM)
 Robin's Wild Ride (broadcast July 18, 2015 on TCM)
 Batman Trapped! (broadcast July 25, 2015 on TCM)
 Robin Rescues Batman! (broadcast September 5, 2015 on TCM)
 Target - Robin! (broadcast September 12, 2015 on TCM)
 The Fatal Blast (broadcast September 19, 2015 on TCM)
 Robin Meets the Wizard! (broadcast September 26, 2015 on TCM)
 The Wizard Strikes Back! (broadcast October 3, 2015 on TCM)
 Batman's Last Chance! (broadcast October 10, 2015 on TCM)
 Robin's Ruse (broadcast October 17, 2015 on TCM)
 Robin Rides the Wind (broadcast October 24, 2015 on TCM)
 The Wizard's Challenge (broadcast November 7, 2015 on TCM)
 Batman vs. Wizard (broadcast November 14, 2015 on TCM)
 Batman Victorious (broadcast November 21, 2015 on TCM)
Source:

See also
 List of film serials
 List of film serials by studio
 List of films based on English-language comics

References

External links
 
 
 

1949 films
1940s action films
1940s superhero films
American superhero films
Live-action films based on DC Comics
American action films
American sequel films
Batman films
Columbia Pictures film serials
Films directed by Spencer Gordon Bennet
Robin (character) films
American black-and-white films
1940s English-language films
Films with screenplays by George H. Plympton
Films with screenplays by Joseph F. Poland
1940s American films
Films based on DC Comics